Darreh-ye Bizhan-e Sofla (also Romanized as Darreh-ye Bīzhan-e Soflá) is a village in Beyranvand-e Jonubi Rural District, Bayravand District, Khorramabad County, Lorestan Province, Iran. At the 2006 census, its population was 122, in 25 families.

References 

Towns and villages in Khorramabad County